The Bismarck, Washburn and Great Falls Railway (BW&GF) was a railroad that was organized in North Dakota on May 12, 1899.  Its offices were located in Bismarck, North Dakota.

History

The BW&GF started as the Bismarck, Washburn & Fort Buford Railroad in 1889 by General William D. Washburn, a U.S. Senator and Surveyor-General from Minnesota.  He was the main owner of the Washburn-Crosby Flour Mills.  By 1903, the railroad ran from Bismarck to Washburn, a distance of 44.81 miles.  In 1904, the road was extended to Underwood.

The railroad primarily carried passengers, mail, coal, and grain.  It also included a steamboat operation.

In 1903, the railroad owned 3 steam engines, 2 passenger cars, 34 freight cars, and 1 caboose.  In 1901, the BW&GF was one of the first US railroads to roster the Mikado 2-8-2 steam engine design.

The railroad was purchased by the Minneapolis, St. Paul and Sault Ste. Marie Railway in 1904.

References

Defunct North Dakota railroads
Railway companies established in 1899
Railway companies disestablished in 1904
Railway lines opened in 1899
1899 establishments in North Dakota
American companies disestablished in 1904